Town commissioners were elected local government bodies that existed in urban areas in Ireland from the 19th century until 2002. Larger towns with commissioners were converted to urban districts by the Local Government (Ireland) Act 1898, with the smaller commissions continuing to exist beyond partition in 1922. The idea was a standardisation of the improvement commissioners established in an ad-hoc manner for particular towns in Britain and Ireland in the eighteenth century. The last town commissioners in Northern Ireland were abolished in 1962. In the Republic of Ireland, the remaining commissions became town councils in 2002, and abolished in 2014.

Lighting of Towns Act 1828

The first town commissioners were established by the Lighting of Towns (Ireland) Act 1828 (9 Geo. IV c.82). This was "adoptive" legislation, which ratepayers in a borough or market town could choose to enact in their community.  As the existing borough corporations were ineffective as local authorities the act came into force in sixty-five towns. William Neilson Hancock explained the act in 1877 thus:

The first clause repealed a number of Acts of Parliament, those of 1765, 1773, 1785, and 1796. Those were all temporary Acts of the Irish Parliament, and the British Parliament in 1807 renewed all of them for 21 years, and that renewal came to expire in the year 1828. It was then renewed for one year for that Session of Parliament to allow legislation to take place. Those Acts are all founded upon the vestry system of management of towns. Some of the large towns had by local Acts got lighting and other matters under vestries in the parishes, and all those Acts were founded upon the idea of extending the vestry system to the management of towns; but the vestries never made the way in Ireland which they did in England, because there was no poor law. The basis of vestries being so popular in England, being on account of the poor law administration. There was no poor law in Ireland until 1838, and the vestries had no real basis to rest on; and in 1828 they were in a most unpopular position, because the agitation which overthrew them in 1833 by the extinction of what is called parish cess, the same as the church rates in England, was just at its height. 1828 was within five years of the total extinction of Irish church rates, so that they had become quite unpopular and unmanageable bodies.

Whereas local acts appointing commissioners for particular places specified a boundary or distance inside which the commissioners' powers would be confined, no such limit was specified in the 1828 act. Thomas Larcom of the Irish Ordnance Survey wrote of the commissioners in 1846:

The boundaries of their assessments are very vaguely defined. Sometimes a mile, or half a mile around the town, or from its centre; sometimes the whole or part of the parish. An attempt was made to survey them for the Ordnance Maps, but they could not be ascertained with sufficient precision.

Municipal reform 1840
In 1840 the majority of Irish boroughs were abolished by the Municipal Corporations (Ireland) Act 1840, and the commissioners established by the 1828 act became the only local council. The town commissioners were recognised as successor to the borough, retaining corporate property and the municipal coat of arms.  Any town with property of more than £100 that lost its borough corporation, but had not adopted the 1828 Act, was to establish "municipal commissioners". There was, in fact, only one town to which this applied: Carrickfergus in County Antrim.

Towns Improvement (Ireland) Act 1854

The Towns Improvement (Ireland) Act 1854 (17 & 18 Vict. c.103) allowed electors of populous places to choose to establish town commissioners. This enabled many newer communities that had never had municipal status to gain local government bodies.  Many of the towns governed by the 1828 act replaced this with the new legislation as it provided the commissioners with greater powers.

Townships established by local acts
A number of towns took a different route to establish local authorities in their areas, by having private acts passed in parliament. These acts established "townships" with defined boundaries, defined the powers of the commissioners, gave them powers to make rates, named the first members and provided a procedure for subsequent elections. The majority of townships were formed in the rapidly growing suburbs of Dublin. To gain further powers or adjust their boundaries the township commissioners had to apply for a further act of parliament.

Changes in the 1870s
In 1872 the Local Government Board of Ireland was formed. One of its duties was to consider applications for the formation of commissioners under the 1854 act, and for alteration of the areas of existing local government towns. The board issued annual reports on its activities, detailing the finances and condition of the various municipalities under its control.

In 1878 Ireland was divided into sanitary districts, with all commissioners in towns with a population of more than 6000 becoming urban sanitary authorities.  The Local Government Board had the power to designate additional towns with commissioners as sanitary districts.

Towns governed under the 1854 Act
There were 76 such towns in 1881:
Arklow, County Wicklow
Athy, County Kildare
Ardee, County Louth
Athlone, County Roscommon and County Westmeath
Antrim, County Antrim
Aughnacloy, County Tyrone
Bagenalstown, County Carlow
Balbriggan, County Dublin
Ballymena, County Antrim
Ballymoney, County Antrim
Belturbet, County Cavan
Ballyshannon, County Donegal
Banbridge, County Down
Bangor, County Down
Ballybay, County Monaghan
Ballinasloe, County Galway and County Roscommon
Ballina, County Mayo
Boyle, County Roscommon
Carlow, County Carlow
Callan, County Kilkenny
Clonakilty, County Cork
Carrick-on-Suir, County Tipperary
Cashel, County Tipperary
Cavan, County Cavan
Cootehill, County Cavan
Coleraine, County Londonderry
Carrickmacross, County Monaghan
Castleblayney, County Monaghan
Clones, County Monaghan
Cookstown, County Tyrone
Castlebar, County Mayo
Dundalk, County Louth
Dromore, County Down
Enniscorthy, County Wexford
Ennis, County Clare
Fermoy, County Cork
Gorey, County Wexford
Gilford, County Down
Holywood, County Down
Killiney and Ballybrack, County Dublin
Kells, County Meath
Kinsale, County Cork
Keady, County Antrim
Killarney, County Kerry
Longford, County Longford
Lismore, County Waterford
Larne, County Antrim
Lisburn, County Antrim and County Down
Lurgan, County Armagh
Letterkenny, County Donegal
Limavady, County Londonderry
Loughrea, County Galway
Maryborough, Queen's County
Mountmellick, Queen's County
Mullingar, County Westmeath
Midleton, County Cork
Naas, County Kildare
Newbridge, County Kildare
Navan, County Meath
New Ross, County Wexford
Nenagh, County Tipperary
Newtownards, County Down
Parsontown, King's County
Portadown, County Armagh
Rathkeale, County Limerick
Roscommon, County Roscommon
Skibbereen, County Cork
Strabane, County Tyrone
Tullamore, King's County
Trim, County Meath
Templemore, County Tipperary
Thurles, County Tipperary
Tipperary, County Tipperary
Tandragee, County Antrim
Tuam, County Galway
Westport, County Mayo

According to the 1878 report of The Local Government Board, the 1854 Act was adopted in Strandtown, County Antrim on 25 February 1878. However the town is not listed in later reports, and was subsequently incorporated into the borough of Belfast.

Towns governed under the 1828 Act
Only 11 towns were still governed by the act:
Armagh, County Armagh
Bandon, County Cork
Downpatrick, County Down
Dungannon, County Tyrone
Fethard, County Tipperary
Mallow, County Cork
Monaghan, County Monaghan
Omagh, County Tyrone
Tralee, County Kerry
Wicklow, County Wicklow
Youghal, County Cork

Towns and Townships under Special Acts
There were 14 towns with commissioners formed under such legislation:
Blackrock, County Dublin
Bray, County Wicklow
Clontarf, County Dublin
Dalkey, County Dublin
Drumcondra, Clonliffe and Glasnevin, County Dublin
Enniskillen, County Fermanagh
Galway, County Galway
Kingstown, County Dublin
New Kilmainham, County Dublin
Newry, County Armagh and County Down
Pembroke, County Dublin
Queenstown, County Cork
Rathmines and Rathgar, County Dublin

Towns governed under the Municipal Corporations Act
Only one town had established Municipal Commissioners following the 1840 Act:
Carrickfergus, County Antrim

In addition to these 102 towns there were 11 boroughs, making 113 towns and cities with some form of local government on Ireland.  For completeness, the boroughs were

Belfast
Clonmel
Cork
Drogheda
Dublin
Kilkenny
Limerick
Derry
Sligo
Waterford
Wexford (restored 1846)

Changes in 1899–1901
The Local Government (Ireland) Act 1898 created a new type of local council, the urban district governed by an urban district council. All town commissioners that were sanitary authorities became urban district councils. In addition, the Local Government Board was given the power to constitute any other local government town with a population of more than 1500 as an urban district, although the ratepayers could petition to prevent the application of this section of the act.

The effect of this was that the number of towns with commissioners was greatly reduced. Two towns still operating under the 1828 Act, Monaghan and Wicklow, were promoted to the 1854 Act by section 41 of the 1898 Act. By 1902, 74 urban districts had been formed, leaving only 30 towns still governed under the 1854 Act. These towns formed part of the surrounding rural district also created by the Local Government Act for nearly all local government purposes, compared with the urban district councils, who enjoyed considerable powers. Over the next few years the number varied as some towns became urban districts and other communities adopted the act of 1854.

Town Commissioners in Northern Ireland
Following partition in 1922, four towns with commissioners situated in the six counties of Northern Ireland. The number was reduced to three in 1925 when Downpatrick became an urban district.  The remaining town commissioners were dissolved in 1959 and 1962, their functions being transferred to the rural district council:
Antrim, County Antrim, dissolved 1962
Aughnacloy, County Tyrone, dissolved 1959
Gilford, County Down, dissolved 1959

Town Commissioners in independent Ireland
In the Irish Free State (Ireland from 1937), town commissioners continued to exist until 2002. The 1854 Act was still occasionally used to create new local government towns. The Local Government Act 1925 enabled existing town commissioners to dissolve themselves and for urban district councils to downgrade themselves to commissioners.

Where commissioners ceased to exist, in the towns of Callan, Fethard, Newcastle West, Rathkeale, Roscommon and Tullow, their duties were taken over by the county council. However, the town still had a legal existence and separate rates were levied in its area, and the county council had to prepare accounts as commissioners for the town. For example, Newcastle West in County Limerick, whose commissioners were dissolved in 1941, received a grant of a coat of arms by the Chief Herald of Ireland in 1980 – the grant being to "Limerick County Council for the Town of Newcastle West". In 1994, these towns were abolished as distinct entities.

The Local Government Act 2001 redesignated both town commissioners and urban district councils as town councils from 1 January 2002. The Local Government Reform Act 2014 abolished town councils. Municipal districts of the county council perform the functions previously performed by the separate town councils.

List of Town Commissioners in Ireland 1922–2002
Ardee, County Louth
Balbriggan, County Dublin
Ballinasloe, County Galway
Ballybay, County Monaghan
Ballyshannon, County Donegal
Bandon, County Cork
Bantry, County Cork
Belturbet, County Cavan, downgraded from Urban District 1950
Boyle, County Roscommon
Callan, County Kilkenny, dissolved 1940
Cootehill, County Cavan, downgraded from Urban District 1950
Droichead Nua or Newbridge, County Kildare
Edenderry, County Offaly
Gorey, County Wexford
Granard, County Longford, downgraded from Urban District 1944
Greystones, County Wicklow, created 1984
Fethard, County Tipperary, dissolved 1936
Kilkee, County Clare
Leixlip, County Kildare, created 1988
Lismore, County Waterford
Loughrea, County Galway
Mountmellick, County Laois
Muine Bheag or Bagenalstown, County Carlow
Mullingar, County Westmeath
Newcastle West, County Limerick, dissolved 1941
Passage West, County Cork
Portlaoise, County Laois
Rathkeale, County Limerick, dissolved 1926
Roscommon, County Roscommon, dissolved 1927
Shannon, County Clare, created 1982
Tramore, County Waterford, created 1948
Tuam, County Galway

References

Sources
Primary
 
 
 

Secondary

Citations

Local government in the United Kingdom
Local government in the Republic of Ireland